POU domain, class 4, transcription factor 3 is a protein that in humans is encoded by the POU4F3 gene. It's a member of BRN-3 group, also known as POU family class 4.

Nomenclature
DFNA15 refers to a type of nonsyndromic deafness, with autosomal dominant inheritance.

References

Further reading
In Vivo Interplay between p27Kip1, GATA3, ATOH1, and POU4F3 Converts Non-sensory Cells to Hair Cells in Adult Mice

External links 
 

POU-domain proteins